Qaragüvəndli (also, Qaragüvəndikli, Qaraqüvəndli, and Karakyuvendikly) is a village and municipality in the Imishli Rayon of Azerbaijan.  It has a population of 1,284. 

This village was created in 1991 when villages Aşağı Qaragüvəndli and Yuxarı Qaragüvəndli were merged.

References

See also
Aşağı Qaragüvəndli (Lower Qaragüvəndli)
Yuxarı Qaragüvəndli (Upper Qaragüvəndli)

Populated places in Imishli District